Saturday is the day of the week between Friday and Sunday. No later than the 2nd century, the Romans named Saturday  ("Saturn's Day") for the planet Saturn, which controlled the first hour of that day, according to Vettius Valens.

Origins

Between the 1st and 3rd centuries AD, the Roman Empire gradually replaced the eight-day Roman nundinal cycle with the seven-day week. The astrological order of the days was explained by Vettius Valens and Dio Cassius (and Chaucer gave the same explanation in his Treatise on the Astrolabe). According to these authors, it was a principle of astrology that the heavenly bodies presided, in succession, over the hours of the day. The association of the weekdays with the respective deities is thus indirect, the days are named for the planets, which were in turn named for the deities.

The Germanic peoples adapted the system introduced by the Romans but glossed their indigenous gods over the Roman deities in a process known as interpretatio germanica.  In the case of Saturday, however, the Roman name was borrowed directly by West Germanic peoples, apparently because none of the Germanic gods were considered to be counterparts of the Roman god Saturn. Otherwise Old Norse and Old High German did not borrow the name of the Roman god (Icelandic , German ).

In the Eastern Orthodox Church, Saturdays are days on which the Theotokos (Mother of God) and All Saints are commemorated, and the day on which prayers for the dead are especially offered, in remembrance that it was on a Saturday that Jesus lay dead in the tomb. The Octoechos contains hymns on these themes, arranged in an eight-week cycle, that are chanted on Saturdays throughout the year.  At the end of services on Saturday, the dismissal begins with the words: "May Christ our True God, through the intercessions of his most-pure Mother, of the holy, glorious and right victorious Martyrs, of our reverend and God-bearing Fathers…". For the Orthodox, Saturday — with the sole exception of Holy Saturday — is never a strict fast day. When a Saturday falls during one of the fasting seasons (Great Lent, Nativity Fast, Apostles' Fast, Dormition Fast) the fasting rules are always lessened to an extent. The Great Feast of the Exaltation of the Cross and the Beheading of St. John the Baptist are normally observed as strict fast days, but if they fall on a Saturday or Sunday, the fast is lessened.

Name and associations

Today, Saturday has two names in modern Standard German. The first word, is always used in Austria, Liechtenstein, and the German-speaking part of Switzerland, and generally used in southern and western Germany. It derives from Old High German , the first part (sambaz) of which derives from Greek ,  and this Greek word derives from Hebrew , . It means literally "Sun eve", i.e., "The day before Sunday".  is generally used in northern and eastern Germany, and was also the official name for Saturday in East Germany. Even if these two names are used regionally differently, they are usually understood at least passively in the other part.

In West Frisian there are also two words for Saturday.

In the Westphalian dialects of Low Saxon, in East Frisian Low Saxon and in the Saterland Frisian language, Saturday is called , also akin to Dutch , which has the same linguistic roots as the English word Saturday. It was formerly thought that the English name referred to a deity named Sætere who was venerated by the pre-Christian peoples of north-western Germany, some of whom were the ancestors of the Anglo-Saxons. Sætere was identified as either a god associated with the harvest of possible Slav origin, or another name for Loki a complex deity associated with both good and evil; this latter suggestion may be due to Jacob Grimm. However, modern dictionaries derive the name from Saturn.

Some Hindus fast on Saturdays to reverse the ill effects of Shani as well as pray to and worship the deity Hanuman. In the Thai solar calendar of Thailand, the day is named from the Pali word for Saturn, and the color associated with Saturday is purple. In Eastern Indian languages like Bengali Saturday is called  ,  meaning Saturn's Day and is the first day of the Bengali Week in the Bengali calendar.
In Islamic countries, Fridays are considered as the last or penultimate day of the week and are holidays along with Thursdays or Saturdays; Saturday is called ,  (cognate to Sabbath) and it is the first day of the week in many Arab countries but the Last Day in other Islamic countries such as Indonesia, Malaysia, Brunei, Central Asian countries.

The element Earth was associated with the planet Saturn in Chinese astrology and philosophy.

The modern Māori name for Saturday, literally means "washing-day" – a vestige of early colonized life when Māori converts would set aside time on the Saturday to wash their whites for Church on Sunday. A common alternative Māori name for Saturday is the transliteration .

Quakers traditionally referred to Saturday as "Seventh Day", eschewing the "pagan" origin of the name.

This is due to the Viking practice of bathing on Saturdays. The roots lör, laugar and so forth are cognate to the English word lye, in the sense of detergent.

Position in the week

The international standard ISO 8601 sets Saturday as the sixth day of the week. The three Abrahamic religions (Judaism, Christianity, and Islam) regard Saturday as the seventh day of the week. As a result, many refused the ISO 8601 standards and continue to use Saturday as their seventh day.

Saturday Sabbath

For Jews, Messianics, Seventh Day Baptists and Seventh-day Adventists, the seventh day of the week, known as Shabbat (or Sabbath for Seventh-day Adventists), stretches from sundown Friday to nightfall Saturday and is the day of rest. Roman Catholic and Eastern Orthodox churches distinguish between Saturday (Sabbath) and the Lord's Day (Sunday). Other Protestant groups, such as Seventh-day Adventists, hold that the Lord's Day is the Sabbath, according to the fourth commandment (Exodus 20:8), and not Sunday.

Astrology

In astrology, Saturn is associated with Saturday, its planet's symbol , and the astrological signs Capricorn and Aquarius.

In popular culture

Regional customs
 In most countries, Saturday is a weekend day (see workweek).
 In Australia, elections must take place on a Saturday.
 In Israel, Saturday is the official day of rest, on which all government offices and most businesses, including some public transportation, are closed.
 In Nepal, Saturday is the last day of the week and is the only official weekly holiday.
 In New Zealand, Saturday is the only day on which elections can be held.
This tradition was introduced to limit dental caries, utilizing the results of the infamous Vipeholm experiments between 1945–1955. (See festivities in Sweden.)
 In the U.S. state of Louisiana, Saturday is the preferred election day.

Slang
 The amount of criminal activities that take place on Saturday nights has led to the expression, "Saturday night special", a pejorative slang term used in the United States and Canada for any inexpensive handgun.

Arts, entertainment, and media

Comics and periodicals
 Saturday Morning Breakfast Cereal is a single-panel webcomic by Zach Weiner.
 The Saturday Evening Post
 Saturday Night (magazine) (Canada)
 Saturday Night Magazine (U.S.)

Films
 The association of Saturday night with comedy shows on television lent its name to the film Mr. Saturday Night, starring Billy Crystal.
 It is common for clubs, bars and restaurants to be open later on Saturday night than on other nights. Thus "Saturday Night" has come to imply the party scene, and has lent its name to the films Saturday Night Fever, which showcased New York discotheques, Uptown Saturday Night, as well as many songs (see below).

Folk rhymes and folklore
 In the folk rhyme Monday's Child, "Saturday's child works hard for a living".
 In another rhyme reciting the days of the week, Solomon Grundy "Died on Saturday".
 In folklore, Saturday was the preferred day to hunt vampires, because on that day they were restricted to their coffins. It was also believed in the Balkans that someone born on Saturday could see a vampire when it was otherwise invisible, and that such people were particularly apt to become vampire hunters.

Music
Groups
 The Saturdays is a female pop group

Songs
 The Nigerian popular song "Bobo Waro Fero Satodeh" ("Everybody Loves Saturday Night") became internationally famous in the 1950s and was sung translated into many languages 
 "Saturday" (Fall Out Boy song) from the album Take This to Your Grave
 "Saturday" (Kids in Glass Houses song) from the album Smart Casual
 "Saturday in the Park" is a song by Chicago
 "Saturday Night" is a song by the Misfits from Famous Monsters
 "Saturday Night's Alright for Fighting" is an Elton John song
 "One More Saturday Night" is a Grateful Dead song.

Television
 Saturday morning is a notable television time block aimed at children while generally airing animated cartoons, although in the United States this has generally been phased out due to American television regulations requiring educational content be aired, along with Saturday outside activities for children
 Saturday night is also a popular time slot for comedy shows on television in the US. The most famous of these is Saturday Night Live, a sketch comedy show that has aired on NBC nearly every week since 1975. Other notable examples include Saturday Night Live with Howard Cosell.
 The Grand Final of the popular pan-European TV show, Eurovision Song Contest, has always aired on a Saturday in May.
 Saturday evenings are a time slot in the United Kingdom, devoted to popular TV shows such as Strictly Come Dancing, The Voice UK, and The X Factor. Many family game shows, for example Total Wipeout and Hole in the Wall, also air on a Saturday evening.

Video games
Saturday Night Slam Masters – Published by Capcom Wrestling, 1993 video game
Saturday Morning RPG

Sports
 In the United Kingdom, Saturday is the day most domestic fixtures of football are played.
 In the United States, most regular season college football games are played on Saturday.  Saturday is also a common day for college basketball games.

See also
 After Saturday comes Sunday
 Black Saturday bushfires, a series of bushfires in Victoria, Australia
 First Saturday Devotions, a day to honor Our Lady of Fatima
 Holy Saturday, the day before Easter
 Lazarus Saturday, the day before Palm Sunday; part of the Holy Week
 Working Saturday

References

 
6 Saturday
Eastern Christian liturgy